Joseph Pfeifer may refer to:
Joseph L. Pfeifer, American physician and politician, member of the United States House of Representatives
Joseph W. Pfeifer, American firefighter, survivor and first responder during the September 11 attacks